Beulah is an unincorporated community in Malheur County, in the U.S. state of Oregon.

The community was named for Beulah Arnold, daughter of Thomas L. Arnold, the community's first postmaster. The post office was established in 1884 and closed in 1947.

Climate
According to the Köppen Climate Classification system, Beulah has a semi-arid climate, abbreviated "BSk" on climate maps.

References

Unincorporated communities in Malheur County, Oregon
1884 establishments in Oregon
Populated places established in 1884
Unincorporated communities in Oregon